The Federal Urdu University of Arts, Science and Technology; alternatively known as FUUAST) is a public university primarily located at Islamabad, Pakistan. The university has two satellite campuses; the central campus is located in Islamabad while the secondary campus is located in Karachi. The administrative and degree awarding units of the university are currently based in Karachi, which also acts as the university's present headquarters. The university offers wide range of academic programs in undergraduate and post-graduate. The university is noted for its engaging research in fine arts, languages, engineering, social sciences and philosophy. With an tentative approximated of ~13,500 enrolled students currently attending the university, it is one of the largest institution in the country and is one of the top 10 universities in the "general category" ranked by the Higher Education Commission (Pakistan).

The Federal Urdu University holds a unique distinction of being as one of the few institutions of higher learning in languages and maintains a distinguish reputation for conducting scientific research towards the advancement of languages, engineering, philosophy, natural, medical and social sciences.  In addition, the university is also known for its financial affordability while engaged in offering an international standard scientific research and development in various academic mulch-disciplines.

History
Urdu College was first established by Baba-e-Urdu Maulvi Abdul Haq in 1949. Then this college was given the status of a University on 13 November 2002 by presidential order and is the first university in Pakistan to teach primarily in the Urdu language. It was established by merging the Federal Urdu Arts College and the Federal Urdu Science College, both in Karachi. President Pervez Musharraf was the university's first chancellor. President of Pakistan Dr. Arif Alvi and Prof. Athar Ata are the chancellor and vice-chancellor of the university respectively.

Campuses and departments

The Federal Urdu University comprises three campuses and a number of departments:
Abdul Haq Campus at Baba-e-Urdu Road, Karachi (previously known as Federal Urdu Arts College)
Gulshan Campus at the University Road, Gulshan-e-Iqbal, Karachi (previously known as Federal Urdu Science College)
Islamabad Campus, Kuri Model Village, Mozah Mohrian, 5B, Near Bahria Enclave Road, Islamabad (established in 2003 near Zero Point, Islamabad. Later moved on to Kuri Model Village)

Abdul Haq Campus
Business Administration
Accounts
Economics
Education
English
General history
International relations
Islamic history
Islamic studies
Law
Mass communication
Pakistan studies
Political science
Psychology
Social work
Sindhi
Urdu

Gulshan campus
Business Administration
Commerce
Economics
Law
Biochemistry
Botany
Biotechnology
Chemistry
Computer science
Geography
Geology
Mathematical science
Microbiology
Pharmaceutics
Pharmaceutical chemistry
Pharmacognosy
Pharmacology
Physics
Statistics
Zoology

Islamabad campus
Applied physics
Business administration
Computer science
Electrical engineering
Urdu
Economics
Mathematical sciences
Mass Communications
English
International relations

Pirzada Qasim Raza Siddiqui was appointed as the first Vice Chancellor of Federal Urdu University in 2002.

Gallery

See also
List of universities in Pakistan
List of Urdu universities
Urdu language
Maulvi Abdul Haq
Baba-e-Urdu

References

External links
 FUUAST Karachi campus official website
 FUUAST Islamabad campus official website

 Universities and colleges in Karachi
 
Educational institutions established in 1949
1949 establishments in Pakistan
Public universities and colleges in Pakistan
Language education in Pakistan
Engineering universities and colleges in Pakistan
Islamabad Capital Territory
Urdu in Pakistan